Joan Howard Maurer (April 2, 1927 – September 21, 2021) was an American writer and actress, and the daughter of Moe Howard of The Three Stooges. She wrote several books on the Three Stooges and had several roles as a supporting actress during the Golden Age of Hollywood.

Biography
In the 1980s, Maurer helped to raise funds for a cancer center dedicated to her father at the City of Hope National Medical Center by providing his autographs as incentives for donors to the facility in Duarte, California. After she discovered about 4,000 cancelled checks that had been signed by Howard, she offered to give one of the checks to each donor who gave $10 or more to the center.

She was married to cartoonist/director Norman Maurer, who wrote, produced, and directed many Stooges films, for 39 years until his death in 1986.

Maurer regularly attended Three Stooges conventions held yearly in Fort Washington, Pennsylvania. Her sons, Michael Maurer and Jeffrey Scott (Maurer), are both animation writers.

All of her books were originally published by Citadel Press.

Maurer died in Los Angeles, California, on September 21, 2021, at the age of 94.

Books

By Joan Howard Maurer

The Three Stooges Book of Scripts ; April 1984
Curly: An Illustrated Biography of the Superstooge ; April 1985

Co-authored by Joan Howard Maurer

Moe Howard and the Three Stooges; written by Moe Howard, compiled by Joan Howard Maurer after Moe's death (July 1977)
 (not to be confused with The Three Stooges Scrapbook unsold 1960 television pilot)
[http://amzn.com/0806510188 The Three Stooges Book of Scripts, Volume II]; with Norman Maurer (April 1987; published after his death in 1986)

References

External links
 

1927 births
2021 deaths
American people of Lithuanian-Jewish descent
American women writers
Jewish American writers
People from Brooklyn
21st-century American Jews
21st-century American women